Leonard James Attley (21 April 1910 – 1979) was a Welsh professional footballer. He made 12 appearances in the Football League for Cardiff City.

Career

Born in Cardiff, Attley joined his hometown club Cardiff City and made his professional debut on 30 March 1934, scoring in a 3–1 victory over Millwall. He appeared in five of the last eight matches in the 1934–35 season but was forced out of the team by Harold Riley during the following year. He was released in 1936 after Cardiff finished bottom of the Third Division South, later joining Yeovil Town.

His nephew, Brian was also a professional footballer.

Career statistics

References

1910 births
Welsh footballers
Footballers from Cardiff
Cardiff City F.C. players
Yeovil Town F.C. players
Association football forwards
English Football League players
1979 deaths